Daniel Boone High School may refer to:

 Daniel Boone High School (Pennsylvania)
 Daniel Boone High School (Tennessee)